Hélio José Ribeiro Pinto (born 29 February 1984) is a Portuguese former professional footballer who played as a central midfielder.

A youth product of Benfica, he spent most of his career with APOEL in Cyprus, appearing in 276 competitive matches and winning eight major titles.

Club career
Pinto was born in Portimão, Algarve. A product of S.L. Benfica's youth system, he could never break into the first team, tottalling just five minutes in the Primeira Liga under José Antonio Camacho. His next stop was in Spain with Sevilla FC, where he only appeared for the reserves.

Still owned by Sevilla, Pinto spent the 2005–06 season in Cyprus with Apollon Limassol FC. Being released the summer, his career settled with another team in the country, APOEL FC.

During his spell with APOEL, Pinto was an important member as the club won the Cypriot First Division on four occasions, adding amongst other trophies the domestic cup in 2007–08. He also appeared in all six group-stage games in their first participation in the UEFA Champions League.

Pinto played eight matches in the 2011–12 Champions League, as the Nicosia-based side surprisingly reached the quarter-finals of the competition. On 5 June 2013, he signed a three-year contract extension but, later that month, announced he was leaving after seven years.

On 21 June 2013, Pinto agreed to a two-year deal (with an option for another season) with Legia Warsaw from Poland. He was released two years later, moving to the Qatar Stars League with Al-Mesaimeer Sports Club shortly after.

On 2 February 2016, Pinto returned to Cyprus and joined Anorthosis Famagusta FC. The following 28 January, he signed with Greek club Trikala F.C. from Norway's Kongsvinger IL Toppfotball.

Following a stint with Indian Super League franchise NorthEast United FC, Pinto returned to Portugal after 14 years and agreed to a contract at third-tier Louletano D.C. on 15 June 2018.

International career
Pinto gained Cypriot nationality on 27 July 2012, and the Cyprus Football Association subsequently waited for FIFA approval on whether could play for the national team. The governing body eventually ruled he could not represent his adopted nation, after having appeared for Portugal at under-18, under-19 and under-20 levels.

Career statistics

Honours
Apollon Limassol
Cypriot First Division: 2005–06

APOEL
Cypriot First Division: 2006–07, 2008–09, 2010–11, 2012–13
Cypriot Cup: 2007–08
Cypriot Super Cup: 2008, 2009, 2011

Legia Warsaw
Ekstraklasa: 2013–14
Polish Cup: 2014–15

References

External links

1984 births
Living people
People from Portimão
Sportspeople from Faro District
Portuguese footballers
Association football midfielders
Primeira Liga players
Segunda Divisão players
S.L. Benfica B players
S.L. Benfica footballers
Louletano D.C. players
Segunda División B players
Sevilla Atlético players
Cypriot First Division players
Apollon Limassol FC players
APOEL FC players
Anorthosis Famagusta F.C. players
Ekstraklasa players
Legia Warsaw players
Qatar Stars League players
Mesaimeer SC players
Norwegian First Division players
Kongsvinger IL Toppfotball players
Football League (Greece) players
Trikala F.C. players
Indian Super League players
NorthEast United FC players
Portugal youth international footballers
Portuguese expatriate footballers
Expatriate footballers in Spain
Expatriate footballers in Cyprus
Expatriate footballers in Poland
Expatriate footballers in Qatar
Expatriate footballers in Norway
Expatriate footballers in Greece
Expatriate footballers in India
Portuguese expatriate sportspeople in Spain
Portuguese expatriate sportspeople in Cyprus
Portuguese expatriate sportspeople in Poland
Portuguese expatriate sportspeople in Qatar
Portuguese expatriate sportspeople in Norway
Portuguese expatriate sportspeople in Greece
Portuguese expatriate sportspeople in India